= Koolivayal =

Village in Kerala, India

Koolivayal is a small town situated near Panamaram in Wayanad, Kerala, India. Its economy is based on agriculture.

== Important buildings ==
- Imam Ghazzali Academy (IGA)
- Sign Institute of Social Leadership
- Nanma charitable, welfare and educational trust
- Co-operative Bank
- Tooth Life Dental Care (Dental Clinic)

== Transportation ==
Koolivayal can be accessed from Mananthavady or Kalpetta. Koolivayal is approximately 3 hours away from Calicut via the Thamarassery ghat road. The Kuttiady ghat road also connects Calicut to Koolivayal and takes approximately 3 hours 15 minutes. The Palchuram ghat road connects Kannur city and Iritty with Mananthavady.

The nearest railway station is at Mysore and the nearest airports are Kozhikode International Airport-120 km, Bengaluru International Airport-290 km, and Kannur International Airport, 58 km.
